Kinloch can refer to:

People
 Kinloch Baronets
 Billy Kinloch (1874–1931), American baseball player
 Bobby Kinloch (1935–2014), Scottish football player
 Bruce Kinloch, author
 Sir Francis Kinloch, 3rd Baronet (1676–1747), scion of a noble family
 Francis Kinloch (Congressman) (1755–1826), American soldier, politician and Continental Congress delegate from South Carolina
 George Kinloch, Scottish MP
 George Ritchie Kinloch, Scottish ballad collector and antiquarian
 Sir John Kinloch, 2nd Baronet, Scottish MP, grandson of the above
 Jimmy Kinloch (died 1962), Scottish footballer (Partick Thistle F.C. and Scotland)
 Sir William Eric Kinloch Anderson, KT, FRSE
 David William Kinloch Anderson, Baron Anderson of Ipswich, KBE, QC, son of above
 Agnes Kinloch Kingston, wife of W.H.G. Kingston and the actual translator of Jules Verne's novels

Places

Scotland
 Kinloch, Fife, a location
 Kinloch, Lairg, a location in Highland
 Kinloch, Blairgowrie, a hamlet and civil parish in Perth and Kinross
 Kinloch, Coupar Angus, smaller settlement also in Perth and Kinrross
 Kinloch, Rùm, Highland
 Kinloch Hourn, Highland
 Kinloch Lodge, Tongue, Highland
 Kinloch Rannoch, Perth and Kinross
 Kinlochewe, Highland

Other locations
 Kinloch, Missouri, United States
 Kinloch, New Zealand